Milan Ohnisko (16 July 1965 in Brno) is a Czech poet and editor. After quitting two secondary schools before graduating either of them he worked in many manual professions. He also had his own publishing house and a bookshop. Currently he works as a freelance editor.

Works 

Ohnisko's poetry is a mixture of naivist technique which uses word play with highly rational punchlines, and neo-decadent sense of tragedy and quixotism of an outsider fighting the mainstream. He often uses and combines naivism, irony, humor and absurdity.

Poetry

Obejmi démona! (2001)
Vepřo knedlo zlo aneb Uršulinovi dnové (2003)
Milancolia (2005)
Býkárna (with Ivan Wernisch and Michal Šanda) (2006)
Love! (2007)
Azurové inferno (2009)
Nechráněný styk (2012)
Oh! Výbor z básnického díla 1985–2012 (Selected poems 1985–2012, editor Ondřej Hanus) (2012)

External links
Czech literature (in Czech)

Czech poets
Czech male poets
Living people
Year of birth missing (living people)